BT (short for "Best Tracks") is the third compilation album by Buck-Tick, released on March 20, 1999. It compiles every single and B-side they released while signed to Victor Entertainment, except the live B-sides of "Die". It also includes a demo version of "Romanesque". It reached number sixteen on the Oricon chart. The album was remastered and re-released on September 5, 2007.

Track listing

Disc One 
 "Sexual XXXXX！"
 "Hyper Love"
 "Romanesque" (Demo Version)
 "...In Heaven..."
 "Just One More Kiss"
 "To-Search"
 "Iconoclasm"
 "Aku no Hana" (悪の華; Evil Flower)
 "Under the Moon Light"
 "Love Me"
 "Speed" (スピード)
 "Narcissus" (ナルシス)
 "Taiyou ni Korosareta" (太陽ニ殺サレタ; Killed by the Sun)
 "M・A・D"
 "Angelic Conversation"
 "Jupiter"
 "Sakura" (さくら; Cherry Blossom)

Disc Two 
 "Dress" (ドレス)
 "Roku Gatsu no Okinawa" (六月の沖縄; Okinawa June)
 "Kirameki no Naka de..." (キラメキの中で ・・・; In the Glitter・・・)
 "Die"
 "D・T・D"
 "Uta" (唄; Song)
 "Kimi e" (君へ; To You)
 "Itoshi no Rockstar" (愛しのロック・スター; Beloved Rockstar)
 "Kodou" (鼓動; Heartbeat)
 "Rakuen" (楽園; Paradise)
 "Mienai Mono o Miyo to Suru Gokai Subete Gokai da" (見えない物を見ようとする誤解 全て誤解だ; Misunderstanding in Trying to See the Invisible, Everything Is Misunderstood)
 "Kimi no Vanilla" (君のヴァニラ; Your Vanilla)
 "Candy" (キャンディ)
 "Chocolate" (チョコレート)
 "Ash-Ra"
 "Cosmos"

References 

Buck-Tick albums
Victor Entertainment compilation albums
2000 compilation albums